The 1999 Buffalo Bills season was the 30th season for the team in the National Football League (NFL) and 40th overall. It would be the final season that Bruce Smith, Andre Reed, and Thurman Thomas, the last three players remaining from the Bills' Super Bowl teams were on the same team together. All three were released at the end of the season due to salary cap reasons.

The Bills surrendered only 229 points (14.3 points per game), the lowest total in franchise history in a 16-game season, and second-fewest in the league. Buffalo's 2,675 passing yards and 4,045 total yards allowed were both the fewest totals in the NFL in 1999.

The Bills finished in second place in the AFC East and finished the National Football League's 1999 season with a record of 11 wins and 5 losses. The Bills qualified for the postseason for the eighth time in the decade. They would lose to the Titans in the game called "Music City Miracle".

The team would not make the playoffs again until 2017, where they were defeated by the Jacksonville Jaguars in the Wild-Card round. They also would not have another 10 win season until 2019.

Offseason

NFL draft

Personnel

Staff

Roster

Regular season

Schedule

Game summaries

Week 1

Week 2

Week 3

Week 4

Week 5

Week 6

Week 7

Week 8

Week 9

Week 10

Week 11

Week 12

Week 14

Week 15

Week 16

Week 17

Standings

Playoffs

AFC Wild Card 

The Music City Miracle is a famous play in the NFL Wild Card Playoffs involving the Tennessee Titans and Buffalo Bills that took place on January 8, 2000 (following the 1999 regular season) at Adelphia Coliseum in Nashville, Tennessee.

Going into the game, Bills coach Wade Phillips created a stir by starting quarterback Rob Johnson, rather than Doug Flutie, who had started 15 games, and who had led the team to the playoffs. Late in the fourth quarter, the stage was set for an exciting finish. Tennessee received the ball with 6:15 remaining. Titans receiver Isaac Byrd's 16-yard punt return and five carries from Eddie George for 17 yards set up a wobbly 36-yard field goal by Del Greco. The Titans took a 15–13 lead with 1:48 to go. On the ensuing drive, with no timeouts remaining, Bills quarterback Johnson led the Bills on a five-play, 37-yard drive to the Titans' 24-yard line. On the last two plays from scrimmage, Johnson played with only one shoe on, as he had lost one and had no time to put it back on, with the clock running out. With only 16 seconds remaining in the game, Steve Christie, the Bills' kicker, made a 41-yard field goal to put Buffalo in the lead, 16–15.

Moments later, Christie kicked off, and Titans player Lorenzo Neal received. Neal handed the ball off to Titans tight end Frank Wycheck, who then lateraled the ball across the field to another Titans player, Kevin Dyson, who then ran down the sidelines for a 75-yard touchdown. The play was named Home Run Throwback by the Titans and was developed by Special Teams Coordinator Alan Lowry.

Official review 
Per the instant replay rules, the play was reviewed by referee Phil Luckett since it was uncertain if the ball had been a forward pass, which is illegal on a kickoff return. However, the call on the field was upheld as a touchdown, and the Titans won the game 22–16.

Aftermath 

The victory, in front of a franchise-record crowd at Adelphia Coliseum, allowed the Tennessee franchise to advance to the divisional round of the AFC playoffs for the first time since 1993. Subsequent victories over the Indianapolis Colts and Jacksonville Jaguars sent the Titans to Super Bowl XXXIV to face the St. Louis Rams, where they lost by one yard.

It could be said that the game served as revenge for the Titans/Oilers franchise for The Comeback, where the Bills came back from a 32-point deficit to defeat the Houston Oilers, 41–38, in overtime.
For the Bills, it led to the firing after 13 seasons of special teams coach Bruce DeHaven. One year later, Phillips was fired (partly due to his failure to lead the Bills past the first round of the playoffs during his tenure) and replaced by Titans defensive coordinator Gregg Williams. It was added to the list of infamous moments in Buffalo sports history, joining Wide Right and No Goal.

Buffalo would go on to miss the playoffs for 17 years following the Music City Miracle, finally snapping its drought in 2017. The Bills then lost in the Wild Card round to the Jacksonville Jaguars in 2017, and again to the Houston Texans in 2019, before finally ending the streak of playoff losses to AFC South opponents against yet another AFC South opponent, the Indianapolis Colts, in 2020.

References

External links 
 1999 Buffalo Bills at Pro-Football-Reference.com

Buffalo Bills
Buffalo Bills seasons
Buff